Erdoğan Akın (1928 – March 2017) was a Turkish footballer. He competed in the men's tournament at the 1952 Summer Olympics as a goalkeeper, conceding eight goals in two matches.

References

External links
 

1929 births
2017 deaths
Turkish footballers
Olympic footballers of Turkey
Footballers at the 1952 Summer Olympics
Association football goalkeepers
Footballers from İzmir